1998 U.S. Open may refer to:
1998 U.S. Open (golf), a major golf tournament
1998 US Open (tennis), a Grand Slam tennis tournament
1998 Lamar Hunt U.S. Open Cup, a soccer tournament for U.S. teams